La Caravana Mágina (in English: The Magic Caravan) is a project of Argentine rock created by Gustavo Cordera, former lead singer of consecrated alternative grouping Bersuit Vergarabat. Unlike his previous project, Cordera devised a project with its own imprint, more personal and romantic; convening a group diverse musicians, fusing modern electronic sounds such as cumbia, the Latin music and River Plate, with the energy of rock.

Discography

References 

Argentine rock music groups
Sony Music Latin artists
Columbia Records artists